is a private university in Kofu, Yamanashi Prefecture, Japan. The predecessor of the school, a women's school, was founded in 1899 and was chartered as a junior college in 1966. It became coeducational in 2001 and became a four-year college the following year.

References

External links
 Official website 

Educational institutions established in 1899
Christian universities and colleges in Japan
Private universities and colleges in Japan
Universities and colleges in Yamanashi Prefecture
1899 establishments in Japan
Kōfu, Yamanashi